Pitthea cyanomeris is a moth of the  family Geometridae. It is found in Congo and in Uganda.

This species has a wingspan of 37–43 mm.

References

External links
images at boldsystems.org

Ennominae
Insects of Uganda
Moths of Africa